Saint-Jean-Lespinasse (Languedocien: Sent Joan Lespinassa) is a commune in the Lot department in south-western France.

See also
Communes of the Lot department

References

Saintjeanlespinasse